Declaration is the fifth album by American metalcore band Bleeding Through. The song's titles are named after different states and cities. Frontman Brandan Schieppati commented, "There are definitely places when we're traveling where every time we go there, we're like, 'Fuck, why do we have to be here?' Like, we'll be in France and all of a sudden we'll feel totally insignificant. You get the feeling that people's eyes are just burning a hole through you."

The album was scheduled for release in August. Schieppati claimed it will be heavier than the band's 2003 release, This Is Love, This Is Murderous, and bridges the gap between This Love and The Truth, "The melodies are darker, the riffs are heavier. We just wrote a really aggressive record that encompasses everything we've ever tried to do as a band and then raised the bar a notch or two."

During the Soundwave, the band previewed a new song from the album called "Orange County Blonde and Blue". The song can be watched on YouTube.

Bleeding Through recently stated in an MTV blog they have finished the record and released details of the album, but do not intend to hand the masters over to Trustkill until numerous issues be resolved. This leaves the supposed August 2008 release date up in the air. Subsequently, they asked to be dropped from Trustkill in the same blog. Whilst playing at Download Festival in June 2008 Bleeding Through's front man Brandan Schieppati said with regards to the albums "We are having trouble with our record label, so when the new record comes out, steal it, download it illegally, do what you fucking want, as long as you the fans hear it".

On June 12, one track from the new album named "Orange County Blonde and Blue" was uploaded to the band's official MySpace page. It is unclear how long the track will remain on the page, as the band have stated it is there "for a limited time". Also it has been made apparent by joining an official fan site called Dearly Demented, which is supported by the band, a person will receive the song "Germany".

On August 21, Bleeding Through announced they would be filming a video for "Death Anxiety" that weekend. It will be directed by Dave Brodsky (All That Remains, Black Dahlia Murder, Gwar) in Los Angeles, California.

The album sold just under 6,000 copies in its first week of release to debut at number 104 on the Billboard 200 chart.

Track listing 
 "Finis Fatalis Spei" – 1:54
 "Declaration (You Can't Destroy What You Can Not Replace)" (featuring Tim Lambesis of As I Lay Dying) – 3:47
 "Orange County Blonde and Blue" – 2:40
 "Germany" – 3:22
 "There Was a Flood" – 5:48
 "French Inquisition" – 4:13
 "Reborn From Isolation" – 4:31
 "Death Anxiety" – 3:30
 "The Loving Memory of England" – 1:27
 "Beneath the Grey" – 3:32
 "Seller's Market" – 2:38
 "Sister Charlatan" – 8:47
Bonus tracks
<li> "Self Defeating Anthem" – 3:17 (on vinyl edition)

Personnel 
Bleeding Through
Brandan Schieppati – vocals
Brian Leppke – guitars
Derek Youngsma – drums
Ryan Wombacher – bass, vocals
Marta Peterson – keys
Jona Weinhofen – guitars

Additional personnel
Produced, engineered and mixed by Devin Townsend
Drums edited by Mike Young
Mastered by Greg Reely
Art direction, illustrations and design by Angryblue

Guest musicians
Elyse Jacobson (violin), Josh Belvedere (violin), Eric Edington-Hryb (viola) and Doug Gorkoff (cello) on tracks 1, 2, 3, 5, 6, 8, 12
Tim Lambesis – guest vocals on track 2
Dave Nassie – guitar solo on track 10

References 

2008 albums
Bleeding Through albums
Trustkill Records albums
Roadrunner Records albums
Albums produced by Devin Townsend